The Dubai Marathon is an annual road-based marathon hosted by Dubai, United Arab Emirates, since 1998.  The marathon is categorized as a Gold Label Road Race by World Athletics.

History

Initial era 

The marathon started outside the Al Wasl Club, and ended inside the Al Wasl Stadium. About 150 runners participated, with 48 of them finishing the race.

The Association of Road Racing Statisticians (ARRS) has no record of a marathon occurring in Dubai in 1999.

Current era 

The postponement meant that temperatures were higher than usual during the race, approaching . Winner  was originally only meant to pace the first , but broke away from the pack once race organizers gave approval.

In April 2007, it was announced that the prizes for the 2008 race would be one million dollars offered for a world record and $250,000 for first place for both men and women, making this the long-distance running event with the greatest cash prizes in history.

The 2008 race was won by Haile Gebrselassie with a time of 2:04:53.  This was the second fastest recorded time for a marathon at that point, not fast enough to claim a world record or the million dollar prize.

The 2012 race proved to have one of the fastest finishing fields at that point: a record of four athletes finished in under two hours and five minutes. Ayele Abshero won with a course record time of 2:04:23 hours, which was the fourth fastest on the all-time lists and the fastest time ever run by an athlete running his first marathon. The other podium finishers also entered the all-time top ten: runner-up Dino Sefir became the eighth fastest man with a time of 2:04:50 hours, while Markos Geneti became the ninth fastest with a time of 2:04:54 hours.  Jonathan Kiplimo Maiyo became the 13th fastest man with a time of 2:04:56 hours, and Tadese Tola became the 16th fastest with a time of 2:05:10 hours.

The women's side was also fast; for the first time in history, the top three runners of a race all finished in under two hours and twenty minutes.  Aselefech Mergia finished with a time of 2:19:31 hours to win, setting an both a course record and an Ethiopian record and becoming the seventh fastest recorded woman. In her first marathon, runner-up Lucy Wangui Kabuu became the eighth fastest woman with a time of 2:19:34 hours, and Mare Dibaba became the 15th fastest woman, finishing in 2:19:52 hours. Fellow Ethiopians Bezunesh Bekele and Aberu Kebede moved up to the 16th and 17th fastest women of all time.

The 2013 event, run under a heavy fog, was also very fast. The Ethiopian winner Lelisa Desisa, won in a sprint finish of the last 200 meters with a time of 2:04:45, leading four other runners who also finished in under 2 hours, 5 minutes. On the women's side, Ethiopian Tirfi Tsegaye won with a time of 2:23:23, sixteen seconds ahead of fellow Ethiopian Ehitu Kiros. The top four runners on the men's side and the top six on the women's side were all Ethiopians.

In the 2015 race, Shure Demise set a junior world record in the marathon, finishing fourth overall.

In 2020, the race organizers stated that they would "not be staging a marathon/mass participation event of any format in Dubai in January 2021" due to the coronavirus pandemic.

The 2022 edition of the race was postponed to  due to the 2022 FIFA World Cup hosted by Qatar, after marathon organizers realized that a shortage of accommodation in Qatar would mean that many football fans were planning to stay in Dubai during the football tournament, limiting accommodation and travel options for marathoners if the race were to be held during the tournament.

Course

Initial course 

The course used in the inaugural race in 1998 started outside the Al Wasl Club and ended inside the Al Wasl Stadium.

World Trade Center course 

The course start and finish was moved to the Dubai World Trade Centre.  During the marathon, runners crossed the Dubai Creek at one point by going under it via Al Shindagha Tunnel, and at another point by going over it via Al Garhoud Bridge.

Current course 

The marathon starts on Umm Suqeim Street, a few blocks southeast of Madinat Jumeirah, and finishes about a few hundred metres further southeast.  The vast majority of the race is run entirely on D 94 road that runs a few blocks away from the coast, including on King Salman bin Abdulaziz al Saud Street (formerly Al Sufouh Road) and Jumeirah Beach Road.

, the marathon course has a time limit of six hours.

Management 

The event is organized by Pace Events FZ LLC,

Sponsorship 

In 2001, Samsung became the title sponsor for four years.

In 2005, Standard Chartered became the title sponsor, and has been since, .

Winners 

Key: Course record (in bold)

Initial era

Current era

Multiple wins

By country

See also
Ras Al Khaimah Half Marathon
Zayed International Half Marathon

Notes

References

External links
 Dubai Marathon official site

Marathons in the United Arab Emirates
Sports competitions in Dubai
Recurring sporting events established in 1998
1998 establishments in the United Arab Emirates
Winter events in the United Arab Emirates